Frank Engel may refer to:

 Frank Engel (football manager) (born 1951), German football manager
 Frank Engel (politician) (born 1975), Member of the European Parliament from Luxembourg